Sackcloth 'n' Ashes is the debut full-length studio album by American band 16 Horsepower, released on February 6, 1996.

Track listing 

 "I Seen What I Saw" – 3:24
 "Black Soul Choir" – 3:52
 "Haw" – 3:35
 "Scrawled in Sap" – 2:46
 "Horse Head" – 3:01
 "Ruthie Lingle" – 2:44
 "Harm's Way" – 3:20
 "Black Bush" – 3:16
 "Heel on the Shovel" – 3:11
 "American Wheeze" – 3:33
 "Red Neck Reel" – 2:41
 "Prison Shoe Romp" – 3:11
 "Neck on the New Blade" – 3:15
 "Strong Man" – 4:21

Personnel
16 Horsepower
 David Eugene Edwards – vocals, banjo, guitar, bandoneon, lap steel guitar
 Jean-Yves Tola – drums, backing vocals
 Keven Soll – upright bass, flattop acoustic bass, cello, backing vocals

Guest musicians
Gordon Gano – fiddle

Trivia
 The instrument credited as a bandoneon on this album is actually a similar instrument called a Chemnitzer concertina.
 The album title is a reference to the Holy Bible (see Matthew 11:20-21 RSV and Esther 4:1 RSV).
 The songs "Black Soul Choir" and "Haw" were both later made into music videos, both of which featured the band.
 The song "Black Soul Choir" was covered by American groove metal band Devildriver on their 2011 album Beast.
 The song "Black Soul Choir" was covered by Big John Bates: Noirchestra on their 2015 album "From the Bestiary to the Leathering Room".

References

1996 albums
16 Horsepower albums
A&M Records albums